Carlina is a genus of flowering plants in the family Asteraceae. It is distributed from Madeira and the Canary Islands across Europe and northern Africa to Siberia and northwestern China.

Plants of the genus are known commonly as carline thistles.

Description
Carlina species are very similar to true thistles (genus Cirsium) in morphology, and are part of the thistle tribe, Cynareae. Most are biennial herbs, but the genus includes annuals, perennials, shrubs, and dwarf trees, as well. The largest reach about 80 centimeters tall. The stems are upright and branching or unbranched. The whole plant is spiny. The leaves have toothed or lobed blades with spiny edges and sometimes woolly hairs. The flower heads are solitary or borne in inflorescences. The head is hemispherical to bell-shaped and lined with several layers of spiny phyllaries. The outer phyllaries may be very long and leaflike. It contains tubular or funnel-shaped disc florets in shades of yellow or red. The fruit is a hairy cypsela with a plumelike pappus made up of tufts of bristles.

Taxonomy and relationships
Carlina is closely related to the genus Atractylis. Together they are a sister group to the genus Atractylodes in the subtribe Carlininae. Carlina has been divided into five subgenera: Carlina, Carlowizia, Heracantha, Lyrolepis, and Mitina.

There are about 28 to 34 species in the genus.

Etymology
The genus name honors the Holy Roman Emperor Charles V (1500–1558).

Uses
Carlina species have been used as herbal remedies in European systems of traditional medicine. C. acaulis root is known as Carlinae radix and is still used medicinally as a diuretic and a treatment for such conditions as skin lesions and rashes, catarrh, and toothache. Most commercial preparations of Carlinae radix are not C. acaulis, but are in fact adulterated with C. acanthifolia, a related species. The essential oil of both species is mostly composed of carlina oxide, an acetylene derivative. The compound has antimicrobial activity. The young flowerhead of C. acaulis is also eaten like an artichoke.

References

External links
 Flora Europaea: Carlina species list and distributions

 
Asteraceae genera
Taxa named by Carl Linnaeus